Alta Idrettsforening is a sports club from Alta, Norway. The club is most known for its association football department, which played in the 1. divisjon until 2014. Alta currently plays in 2. divisjon, the third tier of the Norwegian football league system. The club was newly promoted for the 2008 season; its last stint up to that time in the division came in 2005, when they finished last. The team finished 14th in the 2009 season. In 2012 a new relegation came after finishing last once again. It took them only one year to come back.

They play at Alta Idrettspark, or indoor at Finnmarkshallen when snow and other weather conditions render the pitch unusable. Their attendance record of about 3,000 was set in 1995 against Rosenborg. Notable former players include Trond Fredrik Ludvigsen and Tore Reginiussen.

On December 11, 2018 Alta I.F signed Bryant Lazaro as the head coach, appointed to start January 1 2019.

Recent history 
{|class="wikitable"
|-bgcolor="#efefef"
! Season
!
! Pos.
! Pl.
! W
! D
! L
! GS
! GA
! P
!Cup
!Notes
|-
|2001
|2. divisjon
|align=right |5
|align=right|26||align=right|13||align=right|1||align=right|12
|align=right|60||align=right|57||align=right|40
|Second round
|
|-
|2002
|2. divisjon
|align=right bgcolor=#DDFFDD| 1
|align=right|26||align=right|18||align=right|2||align=right|6
|align=right|79||align=right|38||align=right|56
|Third round
|Promoted to the 1. divisjon
|-
|2003
|1. divisjon
|align=right bgcolor="#FFCCCC"| 16
|align=right|30||align=right|3||align=right|4||align=right|23
|align=right|31||align=right|76||align=right|13
|Second round
|Relegated to the 2. divisjon
|-
|2004
|2. divisjon
|align=right bgcolor=#DDFFDD| 1
|align=right|26||align=right|21||align=right|0||align=right|5
|align=right|95||align=right|21||align=right|63
|First round
|Promoted to the 1. divisjon
|-
|2005
|1. divisjon
|align=right bgcolor="#FFCCCC"| 16
|align=right|30||align=right|5||align=right|5||align=right|20
|align=right|28||align=right|62||align=right|20
|Fourth round
|Relegated to the 2. divisjon
|-
|2006
|2. divisjon
|align=right |2
|align=right|26||align=right|16||align=right|6||align=right|4
|align=right|75||align=right|36||align=right|54
|First round
|
|-
|2007
|2. divisjon
|align=right bgcolor=#DDFFDD| 1
|align=right|26||align=right|16||align=right|4||align=right|6
|align=right|71||align=right|37||align=right|52
|Third round
|Promoted to the 1. divisjon
|-
|2008
|1. divisjon
|align=right |14
|align=right|30||align=right|8||align=right|2||align=right|20
|align=right|49||align=right|66||align=right|26
||Third round
|
|-
|2009
|1. divisjon
|align=right |6
|align=right|30||align=right|12||align=right|6||align=right|12
|align=right|50||align=right|49||align=right|42
||Fourth round
|
|-
|2010
|1. divisjon
|align=right |8
|align=right|28||align=right|10||align=right|6||align=right|12
|align=right|41||align=right|51||align=right|36
||Third round
|
|-
|2011
|1. divisjon
|align=right |11
|align=right|30||align=right|10||align=right|9||align=right|11
|align=right|45||align=right|51||align=right|39
||Quarter-final
|
|-
|2012
|1. divisjon
|align=right bgcolor="#FFCCCC"| 16
|align=right|30||align=right|4||align=right|10||align=right|16
|align=right|30||align=right|61||align=right|21
||Third round
|Relegated to the 2. divisjon
|-
|2013
|2. divisjon
|align=right bgcolor=#DDFFDD| 1
|align=right|26||align=right|18||align=right|3||align=right|5
|align=right|71||align=right|35||align=right|57
|Fourth round
|Promoted to the 1. divisjon
|-
|2014
|1. divisjon
|align=right bgcolor="#FFCCCC"| 13
|align=right|30||align=right|9||align=right|7||align=right|14
|align=right|33||align=right|51||align=right|34
||Second round
|Relegated to the 2. divisjon
|-
|2015
|2. divisjon
|align=right |6
|align=right|26||align=right|12||align=right|6||align=right|8
|align=right|65||align=right|43||align=right|42
|First round
|
|-
|2016 
|2. divisjon
|align=right |7
|align=right|26||align=right|12||align=right|4||align=right|10
|align=right|58||align=right|44||align=right|40
|Third round
|
|-
|2017 
|2. divisjon
|align=right |4
|align=right|26||align=right|13||align=right|7||align=right|6
|align=right|42||align=right|24||align=right|46
|Second round
|
|-
|2018 
|2. divisjon
|align=right |5
|align=right|26||align=right|14||align=right|3||align=right|9
|align=right|39||align=right|28||align=right|45
|Third round
|
|-
|2019 
|2. divisjon
|align=right |6
|align=right|26||align=right|12||align=right|5||align=right|9
|align=right|44||align=right|41||align=right|41
|Third round
|
|-
|2020 
|2. divisjon
|align=right |4
|align=right|17||align=right|9||align=right|2||align=right|6
|align=right|33||align=right|26||align=right|29
|Cancelled
|
|-
|2021 
|2. divisjon
|align=right |6
|align=right|26||align=right|12||align=right|5||align=right|9
|align=right|49||align=right|47||align=right|41
|Third round
|
|-
|2022
|2. divisjon
|align=right |7
|align=right|26||align=right|10||align=right|6||align=right|10
|align=right|38||align=right|45||align=right|36
|Second round
|
|}
Source:

Current squad

Managers

  Isak Ole Hætta

References

External links 
Official site 
Steinberget (supporters) 

Football clubs in Norway
Association football clubs established in 1927
1927 establishments in Norway
Athletics clubs in Norway
Sport in Finnmark
Alta, Norway
Ski jumping clubs in Norway